San Sebastiano can refer to:
 Saint Sebastian in Italian
 San Sebastiano Curone, a comune in the Italian region Piedmont
 San Sebastiano da Po, a comune in the Italian region Piedmont
 San Sebastiano al Vesuvio, a settlement destroyed by the 1944 eruption of Mount Vesuvius, but since rebuilt.
 San Sebastiano (Biella), a church in Biella, Italy
 San Sebastiano (Milan), a church in Milan, Italy
 San Sebastiano (Mantua), a church in Mantua, Italy
 San Sebastiano fuori le mura, a church in Rome, Italy
 San Sebastiano al Palatino, a church in Rome, Italy
 San Sebastiano, Venice, a church in Venice, Italy
 San Sebastiano, Verona, a former church in Verona, Italy